The Westinghouse J46 is an afterburning turbojet engine developed by the Westinghouse Aviation Gas Turbine Division for the United  States Navy in the 1950s. It was primarily employed in powering the Convair F2Y Sea Dart and Vought F7U Cutlass. The engine also powered the land speed-record car known as the Wingfoot Express, designed by Walt Arfons and Tom Green It was intended to power the F3D-3, an improved, swept-wing variant of the Douglas F3D Skyknight, although this airframe was never built.

Design and development
The J46 engine was developed as a larger, more powerful version of Westinghouse's J34 engine, about 50% larger. The Westinghouse model number was a continuation of the "X24C" series of the J34.  The model number assigned was X24C10, even though the J46 differed in many design features from the smaller J34. It was seen as a lower development risk than the Westinghouse J40 which was in parallel development at the same time.

The development program ran into many problems with this engine, including the original electronic control system, compressor/turbine mismatches, combustion instability and control issues at altitude leading to compressor stalling  The produced -8, -8A and -8B engines were all derated from the original design specification on both thrust and specific fuel consumption.

The engine's 12-stage compressor was driven by two turbine stages on a single shaft. Early development engines included a simple "eyelid" afterburner, actuated by control rods that ran the length of the engine. By the time the engine reached production, the rear nozzle had an iris-type "petal" design. The same long control rods now pushed or pulled a ring that ran on rollers, which in turn opened or closed the iris. The original design, using an electronic control system, would have allowed continuous adjustment of afterburner thrust from minimum to maximum. This was abandoned when the electronic control could not be made acceptably reliable; the final afterburner was an "ON/OFF" unit.

Variants

J46-WE-2
J46-WE-3 3,980 lbf (18.15 kN) thrust Was to be used the Douglas X-3 Stiletto. Failed to exit testing due to thrust shortfalls.
J46-WE-4/-10 3,980 lbf (20.02 kN) thrust The non-A/B version of the J46-WE-2/-8B.  Intended for the Douglas F3D-3 SkyKnight but did not go into production because of schedule slippage and the F3D-3 cancellation.
J46-WE-8 3,980 lbf (20.46 kN) (5,800 lbf (27.13 kN) thrust with afterburner)  This variant powered both the F7U-3 and F7U-3M, the missile-capable Cutlass.
J46-WE-8AThis variant powered the F7U-3 Cutlass and produced 5,500/5,800 lbf  of A/B thrust. All -8A engines were upgraded to the -8B build standard after being produced. 
J46-WE-8BThe F7U-3 was equipped with two J46-WE-8B turbojets giving a 680 mph (1,095 km/h) max speed. This variant also powered the Harvey Hustler, a speed boat designed to go faster than 275 mph.
J46-WE-12This variant powered the F2Y Sea Dart hydroski aircraft. Basically identical to the -8/-8B, the aircraft was equipped with a fresh water spray system that flushed salt deposits out of the engine before takeoff and after shutdown.
J46-WE-18This variant produced an increased 6,100 lbf (27.1 kN) of A/B thrust for the proposed A2U-1 attack aircraft, an attack variant of the F7U. This variant was canceled with the aircraft program.

Applications
 Convair F2Y Sea Dart
 Douglas X-3 Stiletto (intended)
 Vought F7U Cutlass

Surviving engines

Carolinas Aviation Museum, - four units in storage, three came from Florida.  Also have two afterburner units, not attached to engines.
Wings Over the Rockies Air and Space Museum, - two units including a -8 cutaway on display (see photo above)
 Project Cutlass, Phoenix Arizona, - six units, including two airworthy engines with afterburners
 Hiller Aviation Museum, cutaway exhibit engine
 Smithsonian National Air and Space Museum, Exhibit 1971-0911, J46-WE-8B, Serial WE405773, 15 total running hours, including acceptance testing and 3 flights in an F7U-3.  In storage.
 Green Mamba dragster owned by Doug Rose in Tampa, Florida
No -1, -2, -3, -5, -12 or -18 engines are known to exist

Specifications (J46-WE-8)

See also

References

Notes

Bibliography
 Roux, Élodie. Turbofan and Turbojet Engines: Database Handbook. Raleigh, North Carolina: Éditions Élodie Roux, 2007. .

1950s turbojet engines
J46